Otoyol 30, also known as the Izmir Beltway and abbreviated as the O-30, is a  long motorway that runs around the Gulf of Izmir from Balçova to Menemen. The motorway acts as a bypass for through-traffic around the city and connects to four other motorways; O-5, O-31, O-32 and O-33. For most of its route, the O-30 runs along the perimeter of Izmir, but enters urbanized areas in Balçova, Bornova, Karşıyaka and Çiğli. The entire motorway has six lanes (three in each direction) and is a part of the E87 and E881.

The first section of the O-30 opened to traffic in 1993 with the most recent section opened in 2008.

History

Construction of the O-30 was started in 1988 in order to relive traffic on the congested D-550, which was the only direct north–south road at the time. Along with relieving inner-city congestion, the O-30 was planned to be a connecting hub for two other motorways under construction at the time. The first section of the motorway was opened to traffic on 12 December 1993, between Karabağlar and Işıkkent. Construction of the O-30 slowed down over the next years, due to financial difficulties. Construction of the southern half of the O-30 progressed faster than construction of the northern half. The motorway was finally connected to the O-32 on 6 August 2002, via a  viaduct through Balçova, thus completing the southern half of the O-30. Due to the slow progression of its northern half, the O-30 was nicknamed the motorway that will never open and residents of Izmir started to protest the delay. Construction was sped up in 2006 and in January 2007 the  section between Bornova and Karşıyaka along with two tunnels was opened. Construction progressed at a steady pace over the next years as the O-30 was extended from Karşıyaka to Çiğli on 15 June 2008.

Exit list

See also
 List of highways in Turkey

References

30
Transport in İzmir Province